Shiksha 'O' Anusandhan (SOA), formerly Siksha 'O' Anusandhan University (SOA University), is a private deemed university located at Bhubaneswar, Odisha, India. The university is composed of nine degree-granting schools and colleges and has a student body of around 15,000. Many of SOA's programs are nationally accredited, including engineering, medicine, pharmacy, business, nursing, biotechnology, science, humanities, environment, nano technology, materials science, agriculture and law.

History 
It was founded as Institute of Technical Education and Research (ITER) in 1996 at Bhubaneswar and it received AICTE approval for B.Tech. Since its inception it was affiliated to Utkal University. Subsequently, it was affiliated to Biju Patnaik University of Technology (BPUT) between 2002 and 2007.

Recognizing its contribution to technical and professional education the University Grants Commission (UGC), in 2007, declared Siksha 'O' Anusandhan as a Deemed to be University by the U/S 3 of the UGC Act, 1956. In 2007, the Institute of Technical Education and Research (ITER), Bhubaneswar became a constituent institute of Siksha O Anusandhan University. Institutes, schools, and departments of SOA University are spread over  campuses in the city of Bhubaneswar.

SOA has been granted Category-II Graded Autonomy Status by University Grants Commission in 2018.

Academics
Siksha 'O' Anusandhan has nine degree-granting schools and institutes that offer undergraduate programs in engineering, medicine, pharmacy, business, nursing, biotechnology, agriculture and law; graduate programs in engineering, medicine, pharmacy, business, nursing, biotechnology, science, humanities, environment, nano technology, materials science, agriculture and law; and doctoral degrees in the above areas.

Admissions

Siksha ‘O’ Anusandhan Admission Test (SAAT), a national level entrance test is conducted by the university every year to select bright students. The test is being conducted for undergraduate and postgraduate programs offered through its constituent institutes/schools.

The university grants scholarships to meritorious and needy students.

Rankings

The National Institutional Ranking Framework (NIRF) ranked Siksha 'O' Anusandhan 37th overall in India, 20th among universities and 21st in the medical ranking in 2021.

Science and research

Research at Siksha 'O' Anusandhan is headed by a dean with the other faculty members. Currently more than 600 research scholars are pursuing their Ph.D.s and 247 of them have been awarded doctorates. Currently, Siksha 'O' Anusandhan has thirteen research centres for basic and fundamental research.

Constituent Units
Centre for Biotechnology (CBT)
Institute of Agricultural Sciences (IAS)
Institute of Business and Computer Studies (IBCS) 
Institute of Dental Sciences (IDS)
Institute of Medical Sciences and Sum Hospital (IMS & SUM Hospital)
Institute of Technical Education and Research (ITER)
School of Hotel Management (SHM) 
SOA National Institute of Law (SNIL)
School of Pharmaceutical Sciences (SPS) 
Sum Nursing College (SNC)

Institute of Technical Education and Research 
The Institute of Technical Education and Research (ITER) is the Faculty of Engineering and Technology of Siksha 'O' Anusandhan. It was established in 1996. Initially it was affiliated to Utkal University and from 2002 to 2007, it was affiliated to Biju Patnaik University of Technology. Since 2007, it is a constituent institute of Siksha 'O' Anusandhan.

ITER includes the following departments:
Engineering Departments
Civil Engineering
Computer Science and Engineering
Computer Science and Information Technology
Electrical Engineering
Electrical and Electronics Engineering
Electronics and Communication Engineering
Mechanical Engineering
Computer Application
Supporting Departments
Chemistry
Centre for Applied Mathematics and Computing
Mathematics
Physics
Humanities and Social Sciences

Campus and facilities

Hostels

The university provides hostel accommodation facilities for boys and girls. SOA has 11 girls hostels and 34 boys hostels to accommodate 4000 girls and 5000 boys. All the hostels have round the clock Wi-Fi connectivity and medical facilities.

The university provides transportation facilities for the day scholars that covers almost all of Bhubaneswar.

Central Library
The central library of the university provides international journals, books and dissertations in all branches of Engineering, Sciences, Medical Sciences, Dental Science, Nursing, Biotechnology, Pharmaceutical Sciences, Mathematics, Physics, Chemistry, Economics, Humanities, Business management, Law.

The libraries participate in resource sharing networks/consortia such as UGC-INFLIBNET and MHRD-INDEST.

SOA-CII 
The Siksha ‘O’ Anusandhan Centre for Innovation and Incubation (SOA CII) is a non-profit startup incubator funded, mentored and nurtured by SOA. It operates as a scaled incubator program that nurtures and accelerates startups in their concept and development stages. The virtual incubatees can work from any corner of the country.

References

External links
 

Universities in Bhubaneswar
Educational institutions established in 1996
1996 establishments in Orissa